The Naoki Prize, officially , is a Japanese literary award presented biannually. It was created in 1935 by Kikuchi Kan, then editor of the Bungeishunjū magazine, and named in memory of novelist Naoki Sanjugo. Sponsored by the Society for the Promotion of Japanese Literature, the award recognizes "the best work of popular literature in any format by a new, rising, or (reasonably young) established author." The winner receives a watch and one million yen.

Kikuchi founded the Naoki Prize with the Akutagawa Prize, which targets a new or rising author of literary fiction. The two prizes are viewed as "two sides of the same coin" and inseparable from one another. Because of the prestige associated with the Naoki Prize and the considerable attention the winner receives from the media, it, along with the Akutagawa Prize, is one of Japan's most sought after literary awards of recognition.

Winners

Bungeishunjū maintains the official archive of past Naoki Prize winners.

1st–100th

101st to present

Winners available in English translation
 1961 (45th) - Tsutomu Minakami (Tsutomu Mizukami), The Temple of the Wild Geese (The Temple of the Wild Geese and Bamboo Dolls of Echizen, trans. Dennis C. Washburn, Dalkey Archive Press, 2008)
1973 (69th) - Hideo Osabe (Hideo Osabe), Tsugaru Jonkarabushi and Tsugaru Yosarebushi (In Voices from the Snow, trans. James N. Westerhoven, Hirosaki University Press, 2009)  
 1979 (81st) - Takashi Atōda, Napoleon Crazy (Short story collection)
 "Napoleon Crazy" (Napoleon Crazy and other stories, trans. Stanleigh H. Jones, Kodansha International, 1986 / Ellery Queen's Mystery Magazine, March 1989)
 "The Visitor" (Napoleon Crazy and other stories, trans. Stanleigh H. Jones, Kodansha International, 1986 / Ellery Queen's Mystery Magazine, December 1988)
 "The Transparent Fish" (Napoleon Crazy and other stories, trans. Stanleigh H. Jones, Kodansha International, 1986)
 "Of Golf and Its Beginnings" (The Square Persimmon and other stories, trans. Millicent M. Horton, Tuttle Publishing, 1991)
 "A Treatise on Count St. German" (The Square Persimmon and other stories, trans. Millicent M. Horton, Tuttle Publishing, 1991)
 1986 (96th) - Go Osaka, The Red Star of Cadiz (trans. Usha Jayaraman, Kurodahan Press, 2008)
 1996 (115th) - Asa Nonami, The Hunter: A Detective Takako Otomichi Mystery (trans. Juliet Winters Carpenter, Kodansha International, 2006)
 1997 (117th) - Jirō Asada, The Stationmaster (trans. Terry Gallagher, Viz Media, 2009 / Shueisha English Edition, 2013)
 1998 (119th) - Chōkitsu Kurumatani, The Paradise Bird Tattoo (trans. Kenneth J. Bryson, Counterpoint, 2010) 
 2000 (123rd) - Yoichi Funado, May in the Valley of the Rainbow (trans. Eve Alison Nyren, Vertical, 2006)
 2005 (134th) - Keigo Higashino, The Devotion of Suspect X (trans. Alexander O. Smith, Minotaur Books, 2011)

Nominees available in English translation
 1963 (49th) - Toshiyuki Kajiyama, "The Remembered Shadow of the Yi Dynasty" (The Clan Records: Five Stories of Korea, trans. Yoshiko Dykstra, University of Hawaii Press, 1995)
 1963 (50th) - Masako Togawa, The Lady Killer (trans. Simon Grove, Dodd, Mead and Company, 1985)
 1983 (89th) - Kenzo Kitakata, The Cage (trans. Paul Warham, Vertical, 2006)
 1988 (100th) - Joh Sasaki, Zero Over Berlin (trans. Hiroko Yoda with Matt Alt, Vertical, 2004)
 1991 (105th) - Miyuki Miyabe, The Sleeping Dragon (trans. Deborah Iwabuchi, Kodansha America, 2010)
 1992 (108th) - Miyuki Miyabe, All She Was Worth (trans. Alfred Birnbaum, Mariner Books, 1999)
 1996 (115th) - Koji Suzuki, Dark Water (trans. Glynne Walley, Vertical, 2004)
 1997 (118th) - Natsuo Kirino, Out (trans. Stephen Snyder, Kodansha, 2003 / Vintage, 2005)
 1998 (120th) - Keigo Higashino, Naoko (trans. Kerim Yasar, Vertical, 2004)
 2000 (124th) - Hideo Yokoyama, "Motive" (original title: Dōki) (trans. Beth Cary, Ellery Queen's Mystery Magazine, May 2008)
 2001 (126th) - Ira Ishida, Call boy (trans. Lamar Stone, Shueisha English Edition, 2013)
 2002 (127th) - Hideo Okuda, In the Pool (trans. Giles Murray, Stone Bridge Press, 2006)
 2005 (133rd) - Hideo Furukawa, Belka, Why Don't You Bark? (trans. Michael Emmerich, Viz Media, 2012)
 2005 (134th) - Kōtarō Isaka, "The Precision of the Agent of Death" (original title: Shinigami no Seido) (trans. Beth Cary, Ellery Queen's Mystery Magazine, July 2006 / Passport to Crime, Running Press, 2007)
 2011 (145th) - Kazuaki Takano, Genocide of One (trans. Philip Gabriel, Mulholland Books, 2014)

Current members of the selection committee
(As of 2014)
 Jirō Asada 
 Mariko Hayashi (ja)
 Keigo Higashino
 Shizuka Ijūin (ja)
 Natsuo Kirino
 Kenzo Kitakata
 Miyuki Miyabe 
 Masamitsu Miyagitani (ja)
 Kaoru Takamura (ja)

See also
 List of Japanese literary awards

References

External links
 J'Lit | Awards : Naoki Prize | Books from Japan 

Japanese literary awards
Awards established in 1935
Literary awards honouring young writers
Fiction awards
1935 establishments in Japan